Candás Club de Fútbol is a Spanish football team based in Candás, in the autonomous community of Asturias. Founded in 1948, it plays in Tercera División – Group 2, holding home games at Estadio La Mata, which has a capacity of 3,000 spectators.

Season to season

24 seasons in Tercera División

Honours
Copa RFEF (Asturias tournament): 2010

External links
Official website 
Futbolme team profile 
Official blog 

Football clubs in Asturias
Association football clubs established in 1948
1948 establishments in Spain
Divisiones Regionales de Fútbol clubs